The surname Kruse may refer to:

 Anine Kruse (born 1977), Norwegian music conductor
 August von Kruse (1779–1848), German general during the Napoleonic Wars
 Frederik Vinding Kruse (1880–1963), Danish jurist
 Käthe Kruse (1883–1968), German dollmaker
 Kevin M. Kruse, American historian
 Max Kruse, several people
 Robbie Kruse (born 1988), Australian footballer
 Rüdiger Kruse (born 1961), German politician
 Sigrid Kruse (1867–1950), Swedish educator, children's writer and suffragist
 Tom Kruse (inventor), inventor of the Hoveround, a type of electric wheelchair
 Tom Kruse (mailman) (1914–2011), Australian mailman, featured in documentary The Back of Beyond
 George Kruse (1880–1965), Australian footballer
 William F. Kruse (1894–1952), American socialist journalist and functionary